Edgar Eladio Estrada Solís (born November 16, 1967), popularly known as "El Gato" (The Cat), is a Guatemalan footballer who has played goalkeeper for several clubs in Guatemala's top division. He was capped 71 times for the Guatemala national football team.

Club career
"El Gato" started his professional career at Aurora F.C., winning the domestic league title in the 1992-93 season. He remained there until 1996, when he joined CSD Comunicaciones. He helped that club win four consecutive league titles. In 2001, he signed with CSD Municipal, where he won two more titles. He then had a second stint with Comunicaciones. On May 11, 2003, he scored his first career goal via a penalty kick. He repeated such action one year later, against his former club Aurora.

After having retired due to a spine injury, he surprisingly returned to play in 2005 for Comunicaciones. He then joined Deportivo Suchitepéquez, of whom he was a member until the end of 2006. As of the 2008 Clausura tournament, he was playing for Club Petapa, which he joined in 2007. He retired after that season but in June 2008 it was said he would perhaps continue his career at Deportivo Zacapa.

Estrada was the leading goalkeeper in terms of goals against average in 11 consecutive league tournaments.

International career
Estrada defended the Guatemala national team between 1995 and 2003, appearing in 80 international matches and becoming the most capped player ever for the country, until Juan Carlos Plata surpassed his mark in 2005. Estrada participated in the qualification processes for the 1998 and 2002 World Cups, receiving 25 goals in 20 matches.

In January 2001, after allowing 5 goals in a defeat against Costa Rica, which eliminated Guatemala from the 2002 World Cup qualifying campaign, he was highly criticised, to the extent of receiving death threats. He would not play any other official international matches that year. He appeared in three more official matches for Guatemala, before retiring from the national team in 2003.

Estrada played in three editions of the UNCAF Nations Cup and in five editions of the CONCACAF Gold Cup. He has represented his country in 20 FIFA World Cup qualification matches.

External links
Edgar Estrada - International Appearances - by Luis Fernando Passo Alpuin, RSSSF

References

1967 births
Living people
Sportspeople from Guatemala City
Association football goalkeepers
Guatemalan footballers
Guatemala international footballers
Aurora F.C. players
Comunicaciones F.C. players
C.S.D. Municipal players
C.D. Suchitepéquez players
1996 CONCACAF Gold Cup players
1998 CONCACAF Gold Cup players
2000 CONCACAF Gold Cup players
2002 CONCACAF Gold Cup players
2003 CONCACAF Gold Cup players
Deportivo Petapa players